Events from the year 1951 in North Korea.

Incumbents
Premier: Kim Il-sung 
Supreme Leader: Kim Il-sung

Events

Deaths

 31 January - Kim Chaek.

See also

Years in Japan
Years in South Korea

References

 
North Korea
1950s in North Korea
Years of the 20th century in North Korea
North Korea